Fritz Mercur (June 23, 1903 – September 1961) was an American tennis player. He was an insurance salesman. In a twenty-year career, Mercur was an inconsistent performer, but at his best had a victory over Bill Tilden (at a tournament at Rye in 1928) to his name. Mercur made his debut at the U. S.
Championships in 1921and lost in round one to that year's finalist Wallace F. Johnson. Mercur lost early at the U. S. championships in 1923, 1924, 1926, 1927 and 1928. In 1929 Mercur beat Wilmer Allison before losing to Frank Hunter in the semi finals. In beating Allison (the champion in 1935), Mercur came to the net and beat Allison at his own game. Mercur lost early in 1930, 1932, 1935, 1936 and 1937.

References

1903 births
1961 deaths
American male tennis players
Tennis people from Pennsylvania